I Love Everybody is the fifth album by Lyle Lovett, released in 1994.  The album consists of songs written by Lovett prior to the recording of his first album, Lyle Lovett (1986).

On the 8th track, "Record Lady," Lyle refers to college friend and fellow musician, Robert Earl Keen.

...Robert Earl, he's a friend of mine
You know he's always looking out for my best interest...

Several songs prominently feature one or more of Lovett's trademark penchants: wry humor ("They Don't Like Me"), playful surrealism ("Penguins") and disturbing frankness ("Creeps Like Me").

Lovett's wife at the time, Julia Roberts, provides backing vocals on several tracks. Other performers lending their voices include Rickie Lee Jones and Leo Kottke.

"Ain't It Something" would later be rerecorded, in a longer form, for Lovett's soundtrack to the 2000 film Dr. T & the Women.

Track listing
All songs by Lyle Lovett, except "Fat Babies" by Lyle Lovett and Eric Taylor

Personnel
Lyle Lovett – vocals, guitar
Kenny Aronoff – drums
Russ Kunkel – drums, percussion
John Leftwich – bass
Edgar Meyer – bass, string arrangements
Joel Derouin – violin
Berj Garabedian – violin
Mark O'Connor – violin (tracks 3, 6, 12, 14, 16, & 17)
Sid Page – violin, concertmaster
Claudia Parducci – violin, background vocals
Barbara Porter – violin
Larry Corbett – cello
John Hagen – cello, background vocals
Suzie Katayama – cello
Steve Richards – cello
Daniel Smith – cello
Lee Thornburg – trumpet
Sweet Pea Atkinson – background vocals
Sir Harry Bowens – background vocals
Lt. Col. L.H. "Bucky" Burruss – background vocals
Willie Green Jr. – background vocals
Paul Halperin – background vocals
Walter Hyatt – background vocals
Rickie Lee Jones – background vocals (tracks 2 & 18)
Jim Kerr – background vocals
Leo Kottke – background vocals (tracks 2 & 18)
Nathaniel Kunkel – background vocals
Ken Levitan – background vocals
Arnold McCuller – background vocals
Gil Morales – background vocals
Herb Pedersen – background vocals
Willis Alan Ramsey – background vocals
Julia Roberts – background vocals (tracks 2 & 18)
Harry Stinson – background vocals
Eric Taylor – background vocals

Production notes
Produced by Lyle Lovett & Billy Williams
Nathaniel Kunkel – engineer, mixing
Gil Morales – engineer
Doug Sax – mastering
Marsha Burns – project coordinator
Tim Stedman – art direction, design
Jonas Livingston – art direction

Chart performance

Notes and sources 

1994 albums
Lyle Lovett albums
Curb Records albums
MCA Records albums